This article lists the provinces of South Africa by their gross regional domestic product (GDP).

See also
 List of South African provinces by gross domestic product per capita

References

Gross state product
Gross domestic product
Ranked lists of country subdivisions
Gross domestic product
Provinces by gross domestic product